James Aaron Moore (died 1904) was a blacksmith, preacher, alderman, state constitutional convention delegate, bailiff, and state legislator in Mississippi. He represented Lauderdale County, Mississippi in the Mississippi House of Representatives. He was accused of involvement in the Meridian Riot and was forced to flee.

See also
African-American officeholders during and following the Reconstruction era

References

Year of birth missing
1904 deaths
People from Lauderdale County, Mississippi
Members of the Mississippi House of Representatives
African-American state legislators in Mississippi